Alan Frank Keele (born November 17, 1942) is an American professor of German at Brigham Young University in Provo, Utah.

Biography
Keele was born in Provo and attended school in Springville, Utah, Laramie, Wyoming, Spanish Fork, Utah, and Bicknell, Utah, where he graduated from Wayne High School in 1960.

Keele is a member of the Church of Jesus Christ of Latter-day Saints (LDS Church) for which he served as a missionary for 30 months in Germany, from 1962 to 1964.  He has also served in other roles for the church, including as a branch president, a Bishop, and twice as a high councilor.

Keele is married to Linda Kay Sellers and they have six children.

Keele has participated in various community and civic activities, including on the board of Utahns United Against the Nuclear Arms Race, on the Area Advisory Council for the Alpine School District, and as chair of the Utah Democratic Forum.  With professor Donald K. Jarvis, Keele co-chaired Russian Relief, an organization to collect food and money to help Soviet citizens in need in the early 1990s, for which he received attention from The New York Times.

Education
Keele initially attended the University of Utah with the intent to major in chemistry.  After his missionary service, Keele attended BYU, where he received his B.A. in German and History in 1967.  He received his Ph.D. in German Language and Literature from Princeton University in 1971.

Career
At BYU, Keele has chaired the Department of Germanic and Slavic Languages and was associate dean of Honors and General Education.  He has served on numerous departmental, college, university and professional committees and councils, contributing to the development of BYU's academics and services.  Keele has participated in the Modern Language Association, the American Council of Teachers of Foreign Language, the German Studies Association, and has chaired the German section of the Rocky Mountain Modern Language Association.

At BYU, Keele has taught German language and literature, and some honors and humanities courses.  He received several honors for his academic work, including Honors Professor of the Year in 1992, the Abraham O. Smoot citizenship award in 1995, the Karl G. Maeser General Education Professorship in 1996, and the Alcuin award in 2007. He is currently the Ludwig-Weber-Siebach Chair of German and Humanities.

Among other publications Keele has collaborated with Douglas F. Tobler, Blair R. Holmes and Karl-Heinz Schnibbe in writing about the activities of Helmuth Hübener and his associates in defying Hitler.  Keele has also written on the works of Günter Grass.

Publishing
Keele has published on postwar German literature, on various social history topics, and two vocabulary dictionaries.  He contributed to translations of the 55 Sonnets to Orpheus and the ten Duino Elegies of Rainer Maria Rilke, and Walter Kempowski's novel Dog Days.  He also created a 10,000 page concordance of the works of Kempowski.

Keele has also written on topics of interest to the LDS community, such as pre-existence and the Mormon resistance movement in Nazi Germany.  His book on Helmuth Hübener was made into a PBS documentary by KBYU. HÜBENER, a major motion picture with a former working title of "Truth and Treason," starring Haley Joel Osment, has been stalled in "current projects" status since 2008.   For his body of work, Keele received a Special Award in Criticism from the Association for Mormon Letters in 2008.  With Marvin H. Folsom, Keele has contributed to foreign language texts based on the Bible and the Book of Mormon.

The following is a list of some of Keele's publications:
.

.

.

.

.

References

Sources
 
Barnes and Noble listing of books by Keele

External links
Alan Frank Keele papers, MSS 7726 at L. Tom Perry Special Collections, Brigham Young University
Walking tour of Vienna (mp3 and PDF files)

1942 births
20th-century Mormon missionaries
American Mormon missionaries in Germany
Brigham Young University alumni
Brigham Young University faculty
Living people
Writers from Provo, Utah
Princeton University alumni
American leaders of the Church of Jesus Christ of Latter-day Saints
Latter Day Saints from Wyoming
Latter Day Saints from Utah